Carl William Barrowclough (born 25 September 1981) is an English former professional footballer who played as a winger.

Career
Born in Doncaster, Barrowclough made his professional debut with Barnsley in March 2001, making a total of 12 appearances in the Football League between then and 2003. After leaving Barnsley in October 2003, Barrowclough went on trial with Doncaster Rovers, before signing for non-League side Leigh RMI a day later. Barrowclough later played for Hyde United.

Personal life
His father Stewart Barrowclough was also a professional footballer.

References

1981 births
Living people
English footballers
Barnsley F.C. players
Leigh Genesis F.C. players
Hyde United F.C. players
English Football League players
Association football midfielders